Criswell College is a private Baptist Christian college and divinity school in Dallas, Texas. The college's stated mission is to provide ministerial and professional higher education for men and women preparing to serve as Christian leaders throughout society, while maintaining an institutional commitment to biblical inerrancy.

History 
Classes began on January 12, 1971, after being founded in 1970 as the Criswell Bible Institute. The school would later be known as the Criswell Center for Biblical Studies before assuming its current name in 1985. The college is named after its founder, W. A. Criswell, long-time pastor of the First Baptist Church of Dallas. Dr. James Bryant was the founding Dean.

Texas oilman, conservative activist, and First Baptist Church of Dallas member H.L. Hunt provided much of the financial support establishing Criswell College.

The college has been affiliated with the Southern Baptists of Texas Convention since 2001 (SBTC provides some financial assistance and has representation on Criswell's board, but the college is independently owned and operated). The college offers Diplomas, Associate of Arts, Bachelor of Arts, Bachelor of Science, Master of Arts and Master of Divinity degrees.

In 2013, the board of trustees approved plans for an expansion of the undergraduate curriculum and relocation. The expanded curriculum now includes undergraduate majors such as Philosophy, Politics & Economics (PPE), Education, and Psychology.

In 2015 the college applied for an exception to Title IX allowing it to discriminate for religious reasons against students based upon sexual orientation, gender identity, pregnancy, and marital status. In 2016 the organization Campus Pride ranked the college among the worst schools in Texas for LGBT students.

Past presidents include Criswell, H. Leo Eddleman, Paige Patterson, Richard Melick, C. Richard Wells, and Jerry A. Johnson. Barry Creamer is the seventh and current president. Johnson resigned from the college in 2008 citing "philosophical differences with the chancellor and trustee leadership about the future of Criswell College." In a related development in 2010, the school officially separated from First Baptist Church of Dallas. Johnson returned as president later that year before leaving in 2013 to become President and CEO of the National Religious Broadcasters (NRB).

Articles of faith
As a conservative Southern Baptist institution of higher learning, Criswell College holds to the Baptist Faith & Message (2000 edition), with some additional passages reflecting the teachings of Dr. Criswell which are still held by the College.

Accreditation 
In 1985, Criswell was first accredited by the Commission on Colleges of the Southern Association of Colleges and Schools (SACS). The school is fully accredited through SACSCOC with a renewal date of 2020.

Notable alumni 
 Daniel L. Akin – President, Southeastern Baptist Theological Seminary
 Emir Caner - President, Truett McConnell University
 K. P. Yohannan – President, Gospel for Asia

References

External links 
Official website

Universities and colleges affiliated with the Southern Baptist Convention
Private universities and colleges in Texas
Universities and colleges in Dallas
Universities and colleges accredited by the Southern Association of Colleges and Schools
Educational institutions established in 1970
1970 establishments in Texas